Harriet Brooks (July 2, 1876 – April 17, 1933) was the first Canadian female nuclear physicist. She is most famous for her research  radioactivity. She discovered atomic recoil, and transmutation of elements in radioactive decay. Ernest Rutherford, who guided her graduate work, regarded her as comparable to Marie Curie in the calibre of her aptitude. She was among the first persons to discover radon and to try to determine its atomic mass.

Biography

Early years 
Harriet Brooks was born in Exeter, Ontario, on July 2, 1876 to George and Elizabeth Warden Brooks. She was the third of nine children. Her father, George Brooks, worked at his own flour mill until it burned down and was not covered by insurance. He then supported the family by working as a commercial traveler for a flour firm. Brooks moved around Quebec and Ontario with her family during her childhood. At some point, she attended the Seaforth Collegiate Institute in Ontario. Her family finally settled in Montreal.

Undergraduate education 
Harriet Brooks entered McGill University in 1894, the only one beside her sister Elizabeth who would attend university and six years after McGill graduated its first female student. 
While Brooks won a scholarship for the final two years of her Bachelor's degree, gender discrimination disqualified her from receiving a scholarship for her first two years. Brooks graduated with a first-class honours B.A in mathematics and natural philosophy in 1898, and was awarded the Anne Molson Memorial prize for outstanding performance in mathematics.

Graduate research
Brooks was the first graduate student in Canada of Sir Ernest Rutherford, under whom she worked immediately after graduating. With Rutherford, she studied electricity and magnetism for her master's degree. In 1899, even before her thesis was completed, her work on damping of electrical oscillations was published in the Transactions of the Canadian Section of the Royal Society. The same year, Brooks received an appointment as nonresident tutor at the newly formed Royal Victoria College, the women's college of McGill University. In 1901, she became the first woman at McGill University to receive a master's degree.

After her master's degree in 1901, she did a series of experiments to determine the nature of the radioactive emissions from thorium. These experiments served as one of the foundations for the development of nuclear science. Papers by Rutherford and Brooks in 1901 and 1902 were published in Royal Society Transactions and in the Philosophical Magazine.

In 1901, Brooks obtained a fellowship to study for her doctorate of physics at Bryn Mawr College in Pennsylvania. During her year there, Brooks won the prestigious Bryn Mawr European Fellowship. Rutherford arranged for Brooks to take this fellowship at his former lab at the University of Cambridge, where she became the first woman to study at the Cavendish Laboratory. While Brooks completed significant work during her time at Cambridge, her supervisor, J.J. Thomson, was preoccupied with his own research and ignored her progress. She saw the irrelevance of advanced degrees in the British context. 

In 1903, Brooks returned to her position at Royal Victoria College and rejoined Rutherford's group, carrying out research that was published in 1904.

Career
In 1905, Brooks was appointed to the faculty of Barnard College in New York City and for two years she did not research but teach. When in 1906, she became engaged to a Columbia University physics professor, Dean Laura Gil of Barnard responded by saying "that whenever your marriage does take place it ought to end your official relationship with the college". This began a heated exchange of letters, in which Brooks conveyed that she felt she had a duty to both her profession and her sex to continue her work even after marriage. Brooks was backed by the head of Barnard's physics department, Margaret Maltby. However, Dean Gil cited the college's trustees, who argued that one could not be both a married woman and a successful academic. Brooks broke off her engagement and agreed to stay at Barnard.

In the summer of 1906, Brooks moved to a retreat in the Adirondack mountains run by John and Prestonia Martin, two prominent Fabian Socialists. Through the Martins, she became acquainted with Russian author Maxim Gorky. In October 1906, Brooks travelled with Gorky and a group of other Russians to the Italian island of Capri. During this time, Brooks met Marie Curie, and shortly after started working as one of Curie's staff at the Institut du Radium in Paris, France. Though none of Brooks' research was published under her name during this period, her contributions were considered valuable and she was cited in three contemporary articles published under the aegis of the Curie Institute. During this time, Brooks secured her a position at the University of Manchester. In the letter of recommendation Rutherford wrote for Brooks' application, he noted that "next to Mme Curie she is the most prominent woman physicist in the department of radioactivity. Miss Brooks is an original and careful worker with good experimental powers and I am confident that if appointed she would do most excellent research work in Physics". 

However, Brooks decided to terminate her physics career for unknown reasons, giving room for speculation.
In 1992, it has been suggested that "provinciality and social convention" turned her away from physics, while others have pointed out, that she had met women academics and could have continued research, "but she preferred conventional pleasures".

Personal life and death
In 1907, at the age of 31, Brooks married a wealthy engineer of the Montreal Power and Water Company former McGill physics instructor Frank Pitcher and settled in Montreal.  She had three children, two of whom tragically died in their teens. Her life revolved around domestic life, organizing the activities of household servants. She remained active in organizations of university women, but no longer did any work in the field of physics.

Her sister Elizabeth married physicist Arthur Stewart Eve.

Brooks died April 17, 1933 in Montreal at the age of 57 "of a ‘blood disorder’," presumably leukaemia caused by radiation exposure.

The obituary in the The New York Times on April 18, 1933 credited her as the "Discoverer of the Recoil of a Radioactive Atom."

Rutherford wrote a highly laudatory obituary in the journal Nature.

Legacy 
In the 1980s, the importance of Harriet Brooks' contributions to physics became recognized as foundational work in the field of nuclear science. She was the first person to show that the radioactive substance emitted from thorium was a gas with molecular weight of 40–100, a discovery crucial to the determination of transmutation of elements in radioactive decay.

In 2002, 69 years after her death she was inducted into the Canadian Science and Engineering Hall of Fame.

Canadian Nuclear Laboratories considered her research of radon and actinium pioneering, and her brief research career exceedingly accomplished. In 2016, 110 years after she finished her career, the Harriet Brooks Building, a nuclear research laboratory At Chalk River Laboratories was named after her.

References

Further reading
 
 E. Rutherford and H. T. Brooks, "The New Gas from Radium," Trans. R. Soc. Canada, 1901, Section III, 21
 Brooks, H. (1901) "Damping of the oscillations in the discharge of a Leyden jar." Master's thesis.

External links
Canadian Science and Technology Museum
Article at UCLA

Canadian nuclear physicists
1876 births
1933 deaths
Canadian women physicists
Persons of National Historic Significance (Canada)
Barnard College faculty
20th-century Canadian physicists
20th-century Canadian women scientists
Women nuclear physicists